The 2018 Dynamic Billiard Leende Open, was the fourth Euro Tour 9-Ball pool event in 2018. The event was won by America's Shane Van Boening who defeated Albania's Eklent Kaçi  9–8 in the final. Unlike other Euro Tour events, the field was open to other nations outside of Europe. Van Boening became the only American after Johnny Archer in 2000 to win a Euro Tour event. In making the final, Eklent had been in the semi-final or better of the last 5 Euro Tour events.

Ruslan Tschinachow was the defending champion, but did not reach the knockout stages of the event. A women's event held in Braga at the same time as the event was held in Braga, Portugal. The event was won by Kristina Tkach defeating Marharyta Fefilava in the final 7–0.

Tournament format
The event saw a total of 159 players compete, in a double-elimination knockout tournament, until the last 32 stage; where the tournament was contested as single elimination.

Prize fund 
The tournament prize fund was similar to that of other Euro Tour events, with €4,500 for the winner of the event.

Tournament results

References

External links

 official website 

Euro Tour
September 2018 sports events in the Netherlands
Leende Open
2018 Euro Tour events
International sports competitions hosted by the Netherlands
Sports competitions in Heeze-Leende